Stickney House may refer to:

in the United States (by state then city)
Charles H. Stickney House, Pueblo, Colorado, listed on the National Register of Historic Places (NRHP) in Pueblo County
George Stickney House, Woodstock, Illinois, listed on the NRHP in McHenry County
Stickney-Shepard House, Cambridge, Massachusetts, listed on the NRHP in Middlesex County
Bacon-Stickney House, Colonie, New York, listed on the NRHP in Albany County
Stickney House (Lockport, New York), listed on the NRHP in Niagara County